Hiroyuki Kaidō (sometimes Kaidou) 海童博行 is a manga artist and animation director.

Her works include the artwork for the manga adaption of the video game Tales of Innocence, which is serialized in Jump SQ. Kaidou has worked on two series with writer Yoshihiko Tomizawa, doing the artwork for Onmyou Taisenki and Gurimaru.

Works 
Tales of Innocence (Jump SQ.)
Onmyō Taisenki manga and television show.

References

External links

Manga artists
Living people
Year of birth missing (living people)